The year 1787 in architecture involved some significant events in architectural history.

Events
The Hameau de Chantilly, a group of cottages, is constructed by Bathilde d'Orléans, Duchess of Bourbon, in the gardens of the Élysée Palace in Paris, in imitation of a village at the Château de Chantilly, her principal residence.
 The Royal Pavilion, at Brighton (England) is established as a seaside retreat for George, Prince of Wales. Extensive building work begins.

Buildings and structures

Buildings completed
United States:
Charleston, SC: the Unitarian Universalist Church (a National Historic Landmark).
Bedford, New York: the Court House in Bedford Village (renovated in the 1960s), part of Bedford Village Historic District.
White Plains, NY: the second courthouse, built on the foundation of the first (1759) courthouse.
Philadelphia, PA: the Morris House Hotel.
Jefferson County, Ohio: Fort Steuben, housing the first American Army Regiment.

The Hermitage Theatre, designed by Giacomo Quarenghi, in Saint Petersburg, Russia.
The Museum of Natural History, later the Museo del Prado, in Madrid, Spain, designed by Juan de Villanueva (approximate date).
Church of La Soledad, Mexico City, designed by Father Gregorio Pérez Cancio with the help of architects Cayetano de Sigüenza, Ildefonso Iniesta Bejarano, Francisco Antonio de Guerrero y Torres and Ignacio Castera.
Al-Nabi Mosque, Qazvin (Persia), probably designed by Ustad Mirza Shirazi.
Qingshui Temple in Taipei (Taiwan).
 Dome of the Sanctuary of Santa Maria della Vita, Bologna, Italy, designed by Giuseppe Tubertini.

Buildings opened
October 14 – Theater auf der Wieden, designed by Andreas Zach, in suburban Vienna, Austria

Births
January 26 – Aleksandr Vitberg, Russian Neoclassical architect (died 1855)
November 26 – Pascal Coste, French architect and engineer working in Egypt (died 1879)
date unknown
Ignatius Bonomi, English architect (died 1870)
John Dobson, English architect (died 1865)
John Peter Gandy, English architect (died 1850)

Deaths
April 7 – Sir Nigel Gresley, 6th Baronet, builder of Sir Nigel Gresley's Canal (born c.1727)
May 8 – Antonio Brianti, Italian architect (born 1739)

References

Architecture
Years in architecture
18th-century architecture